Comando Vermelho (Red Command or Red Commando), also known as C.V. is a Brazilian criminal organization engaged primarily in drug trafficking, arms trafficking, protection racketeering, kidnappings-for-ransom, armored truck hijackings, loansharking, irregular warfare, narco-terrorism, and turf wars against rival criminal organizations, such as Primeiro Comando da Capital and Terceiro Comando Puro. The group, originally known as Falange Vermelha ("Red Phalanx"), was formed in 1979 as an alliance between ordinary convicts and leftist militants who were incarcerated together during the military dictatorship of 1964–1985. In the early 1980s, the group changed its name to Comando Vermelho and abandoned its far-left political ideology.

Comando Vermelho controls parts of Rio de Janeiro and has fought several small-scale conflicts (in 2001 and 2004) with the rival gang Terceiro Comando which itself emerged from a power struggle amongst the leaders of Comando Vermelho during the mid-1980s.

The organization is a collection of independent cells rather than having a strict hierarchy, however prominent bosses include Luiz Fernando da Costa and Isaias da Costa Rodrigues. The group calls leaders "donos" (Portuguese for "owners"), and has different donos in charge of different aspects of the gang's life. The Red Command "president" and "vice-president" positions are held by donos that are currently incarcerated. These incarcerated donos practice internal criminal governance as described by Lessing. In prison, the donos "rule prison life, settle internal faction disputes that occur outside of prison and make the final decision on any matters of mutual interest for faction affiliates."

In late June 2007, Rio de Janeiro police launched a large-scale assault on the area where up to 24 people were killed. According to a study by the Federal University of Rio de Janeiro's Violence Research Center, in 2008 the group controlled 38.8% of the city's most violent areas, down from 53% in 2005.

Comando Vermelho and funk carioca 
The Comando continue to attract new Brazilian youth and bring them into their ranks. In addition to sponsoring groups like neighborhood associations and special interest clubs, and organizing sporting events, one of the most common ways in which the criminal organization is able to catch the youth's attention is through the popular musical style of funk, a form of Brazilian music derived from Miami Bass. Due to the genre's popularity with young Brazilians, the group "is known to have subsidized funk parties to recruit young kids for drug dealing".

In addition to these funk parties (bailes funk), "where drugs and sex attract even bourgeois or petty-bourgeois youth", held regularly by the organization every Sunday, funk artists are also sponsored by the Comando Vermelho to record songs and even entire CDs that promote the group and eulogize the group's dead members. Because the Comando pays for the production and recording of the funk songs, they "are often well recorded and of a high technical quality, and are being played on pirate radio stations and sold by hundreds of street vendors in Rio de Janeiro and in São Paulo". Thus the funk artists that are in league with Comando Vermelho sometimes garner significant sales and airplay despite making a type of music that is Proibidão, or "extremely prohibited", in terms of where it can be sold and who can play it. In addition to promoting the crime group, the funk sponsored by the Comando also challenges the ideas and laws of the Division of the Repression Against Drugs.

Structure 
According to accounts recorded by investigative journalists, Red Commando's structure consists of a "loose" arrangement in which a syndicate of individual criminals are associated and united under a leadership command. Rather than a hierarchical organization, Red Commando has been described as a "network of independent actors."

On the Global Organized Crime Index, Brazil has been given a "Criminality" score of 6.50 and ranks 22nd out of 193 countries and has been given a "Resilience" score of 5.04 and ranks 87th out of 193 countries. Higher Criminality scores are indicative of greater criminality conditions while higher Resilience scores are indicative of how well a country responds to organized crime.

Attacks of government targets 

On 19 November 2016, a police helicopter of the Rio de Janeiro police was shot down by small arms fire during a clash with gang members of Comando Vermelho and crashed in a ditch. All four police officers on board were killed.
In June 2018, the Red Command launched attacks on a Bolivian Army base in Porvenir and a Brazilian police station in Epitaciolandia, in both instances stealing weapons and ammunition.

Women's roles in the gang 
Women's roles within Red Commando are not clearly defined, but by analyzing PCC, a similar group, women are observed as exercising positions of power and participating in gang justice and violence, challenging the misconception that women are only utilized in the lowest echelons. Traditionally, women in Brazilian gangs are assumed to possess little power and are thought to be connected only through close relationships for whom they serve to help with domestic duties, carrying messages, or smuggling drugs. However, women have been increasingly incorporated into the arrangement and enactment of crimes, revealing that women are able to rise to higher leadership positions and are willing to take part in the violence.

In popular culture 
Ross Kemp made a documentary about the Red Command (CV).  The film City of God shows the early beginnings of Comando Vermelho. The DVD release of this movie contains an extra documentary "News of a Private War" which features interviews with the police and local children from the favelas (slums).

The Brazilian crime film "400 contra 1", released in 2010, narrates a fictionalized history of the birth of the gang in the late 1970s.

See also 

 Primeiro Comando da Capital
 Militias-Comando Vermelho conflict

References

Citations

General bibliography 
 "Blood on the streets as drug gang and police fight for control of Rio favelas" in The Guardian
 UNODC Report: Firearms and drugs fuel conflict in Brazil's favelas
 
 

1979 establishments in Brazil
Far-left politics in Brazil
Organized crime groups in Brazil
Street gangs
Terrorism in Brazil